Trachylinae (also Trachylina, Trachylinida, etc.) is a subclass of hydrozoans. It is placed at order rank in many older classifications, and limited to contain the Narcomedusae, Trachymedusae, the Actinulidae, then considered an independent order, and also the Limnomedusae which were traditionally placed in the paraphyletic "Hydroida". It is not entirely clear whether the Limnomedusae and the Trachymedusae as conventionally circumscribed are monophyletic

The freshwater jelly Craspedacusta sowerbyi is a well-known member of the Limnomedusae and might thus belong here.

Development
Of the four orders: Narcomedusae, Trachymedusae, Actinulidae, and Limnomedusae, only Limnomedusae has any sort of polyp stage, and even then it is very tiny(less than 1mm) with no tentacles. This is uncommon for other jellyfish under the phylum cnidaria. These jellyfish also tend to have fewer cells during their embryonic and larvae stage.

Footnotes

References
  (2005): The Hydrozoa Directory - Hydrozoan Phylogeny and Classification. Retrieved 2008-JUL-08.
Osadchenko, B.V., Kraus, Y.A. Trachylina: The Group That Remains Enigmatic Despite 150 Years of Investigations. Russ J Dev Biol 49, 134–145 (2018). https://doi.org/10.1134/S1062360418030074

 
Hydrozoa
Animal subclasses